Nebris is a small genus of fish in the family Sciaenidae.

Species
There are currently two recognized species in this genus:
 Nebris microps G. Cuvier, 1830 (Smalleye croaker)
 Nebris occidentalis Vaillant, 1897 (Pacific smalleye croaker)

References

Sciaenidae
Taxa named by Georges Cuvier